Agama parafricana is a species of lizard in the family Agamidae. It is a small lizard found in Togo, Ghana, Benin, and Nigeria.

References

Agama (genus)
Reptiles described in 2012
Taxa named by Jean-François Trape
Taxa named by Oleg Mediannikov
Taxa named by Sébastien Trape